Oscar Masarona Mathafa is a South African politician of the African National Congress who has been serving as a Member of the National Assembly of South Africa since May 2019.

Parliamentary career
Mathafa is a member of the African National Congress. Prior to the general election on 8 May 2019, he was placed eleventh on the party's regional Gauteng election list. After the election, he was nominated to the National Assembly of South Africa. He was sworn in as a Member of Parliament on 22 May 2019. Mathafa was given his committee assignments on 27 June 2019.

Committee assignments
Standing Committee on Auditor-General
Standing Committee on Appropriations

References

External links
Mr Oscar Masarona Mathafa at Parliament of South Africa

Living people
Year of birth missing (living people)
People from Gauteng
Members of the National Assembly of South Africa
African National Congress politicians